Chalo Let's Go  is a 2008 Indian movie in Bengali starring Ritwick Chakraborty, Rudranil Ghosh, Saswata Chatterjee and Parambrata Chatterjee, written and directed by Anjan Dutt.

Plot
This is a story about four friends, Hari, Shekhar, Ashim, and Sanjay. They studied at the same school. Ashim studied to be a doctor but decided to never pursue that profession. Sanjay worked for an advertisement agency but left the job. The rest have never held jobs. They started a Bengali band, but they were beaten up by the public at a stage show in North Bengal. They vowed to never perform again.

At this point, they start a travel agency, called 'Gharoa Travels'. On their first trip, they start with nine passengers. On the way to the hills, suddenly a young woman named Ria joins them. The film deals with their journey through North Bengal. The ten tourists and the four operators form an assorted medley of characters. As the journey progresses, their natures are slowly revealed. The film has flash-forwarding juxtaposed with the present, giving the audience a sense of the fates of the characters as the story progresses.

Cast
 Saswata Chatterjee as Ashim
 Parambrata Chatterjee as Sanjoy (as Parambrata Chattopadhyay)
 Rudranil Ghosh as Hari
 Ritwick Chakraborty as Shekhar
 Churni Ganguly as Miss Gombhir (or Miss Ganguly)
 Aparajita Ghosh Das as Ria (as Aparajita)
 Bidipta Chakraborty as Madhuja
 Koneenica Banerjee as June
 Sunita Sengupta as Tulu (as Sunita)
 Dhruv Mookerji as Dr. Basu
 Neel Mukherjee as Rudrashekhar
 Arindam Sil as Rabi Chatterjee
 Kaushik Ganguly as Anando
 Barun Chanda as Prof. Dhurjati

Rest of the cast members

 Deep Arora
 Sudhir Bhitolkoty
 Ronit Ghosh
 Ronjit Ghosh
 Rohit Kumar Gupta
 Bijon Karmakar
 Sandip Mukherjee
 Austin Plant

Cast synopsis

Saswata Chattopadhyay plays Ashim, one of the four friends who start the travel agency. Ashim is a trained doctor, but he wants to do something else. His life changes completely after the trip to Darjeeling. The character is very dynamic and he changes for the better at the end. He is attracted to Miss Gombhir in a very subtle way.
Parambrato Chattopadhyay plays Sanjoy. He is the narrator of the story. Sanjoy wanted to be a journalist but starts a travel agency instead with three friends (Rudranil, Saswata and Ritwick). He is shrewd and thinks a lot before he speaks. Sanjoy is the backbone of Chalo Let’s Go.
Ritwick Chakraborty plays Shekhar, one of the four friends. Shekhar makes it very big as a singer later. He is the son of wealthy father, rude and always angry but very innocent. There's no love angle to this character; he is basically an ambitious guy.
Arindam Sil plays Rabi Chatterjee, a Casanova who lives with June (Koneenica) and loves to introduce himself as "Madamcrackerologist".
Rudranil Ghosh plays Hari, the lead vocalist of a Bangla band. The other members are Parambrata, Ritwick and Saswata. But after a disastrous performance, the four friends get into the travel business. Then they go travelling. A lot of the story unfolds in Darjeeling. Hari is a simple guy whose girlfriends run away because he can't speak English. But Ria falls for him.
Churni Gangopadhyay plays Miss Ganguly, a very sophisticated detective story writer. Her fellow travellers call her Miss Gombhir. But she is a very understanding woman and before anyone else realises she becomes a part of their lives. Though she seems unapproachable, she is just the opposite.
Koneenika Bandyopadhyay plays June, a very small role. She is a very fashionable girl in a live-in relationship with Rabi (Arindam Sil). June doesn't interact with anyone else. And everyone gossips about her.
Aparajita Ghosh Das plays Ria, who is very confused with life. Ria is a bit tomboyish and she hides her identity because she thinks it will help her in some way. The one person she connects with is Churni (Ganguly), who gives her shelter. Parambrata and Rudranil like Ria, so there's a love triangle and even more confusion.
Kaushik Ganguly plays Anando, a spineless character who is extremely scared of his wife Madhuja (Bidipta).
Neel Mukherjee plays Rudrashekhar, a bachelor who loves to travel but complains about everything and everyone. He cribs about his seat on the bus, his hotel room, and everything else under the sun. The others dislike him for this but there's a slow change in him.
Barun Chanda plays Dhurjati, a kinky professor of chemistry. Nobody knows much about him. He has a research paper to develop, which is actually a book on pornography. He can't see anything good in anyone. But there is a gradual change in him. He connects with Shekhar (Ritwick) like a father. And he is secretly attracted to Miss Gombhir.
Sunita Sengupta plays Tulu, an NRI married to Dhruv (Dr Basu). They are on a vacation in India. Tulu is a little psychic. She has a strong sixth sense and is into tarot card reading. Her husband pampers her a lot.
Bidipta Chakraborty plays Madhuja, the middle-class wife of Kaushik Ganguly. She is full of Bengali idiosyncrasies. She would take care of her husband and worry about him. But she is trapped in a bad marriage and she confesses that to June (Koneenica).
Dhruv Mookherji plays Dr Basu, a cardiologist from London. He is married to Tulu (Sunita) and has come to India after many years. Dr Basu loves to jabber away and would strike up a conversation even when the other person is not interested. The only person he doesn't get along with is Dhurjati (Chanda).

Soundtrack
The music has been composed by Neel Dutt and has been released under Saregama.

Critical reception

References

External links
telegraphindia.com

2008 films
2000s Bengali-language films
Bengali-language Indian films
Films directed by Anjan Dutt